The Welsh Women's Bowling Association (WWBA) (founded in 1932 as Welsh Ladies Bowls Association) is the governing body for women's outdoor bowling clubs in Wales. It has eight affiliated counties and 160 affiliated clubs. The WBA organise competitions, including the county championship, and select and manage the national side. At the 2009 Atlantic Rim Championship in Johannesburg, the Welsh women's team finished first.

The Welsh Women's Bowling Association is based at Knighton, Powys.

See also
Welsh Bowls Federation
Welsh Bowling Association
Welsh Crown Green Bowling Association
Welsh Indoor Bowls Association
Welsh Ladies Indoor Bowling Association
Welsh Short Mat Bowls Association

References

External links
Official website

Bowling
Bowls in Wales
1932 establishments in Wales
Women's sport in Wales